Leandro Nicolás Contín (born 7 December 1995) is an Argentine professional footballer who plays as a forward for Gimnasia La Plata.

Career
Contín had a youth spell with Club Sol Naciente, before joining Argentine Primera División side Gimnasia y Esgrima (LP) in 2013. He was an unused substitute twice during the 2014 Argentine Primera División campaign for matches against Defensa y Justicia and San Lorenzo. Two seasons later, in 2016, Contín made his professional debut in a home win against Quilmes on 4 April 2016. Another appearance came versus Belgrano on 10 April, prior to Contín scoring his first senior goal against Rosario Central on 2 May. During 2016 and 2016–17, Contín scored three goals in thirteen matches.

In July 2018, Contín was loaned to the club's namesake Gimnasia y Esgrima (J) of Primera B Nacional. He scored goals against Arsenal de Sarandí, Instituto, Los Andes and Villa Dálmine across twenty-two appearances for the club.

Career statistics
.

References

External links

1995 births
Living people
People from Caá Catí
Argentine footballers
Association football forwards
Argentine Primera División players
Primera Nacional players
Club de Gimnasia y Esgrima La Plata footballers
Gimnasia y Esgrima de Jujuy footballers
Sportspeople from Corrientes Province